Ryu Seung-woo (born 17 December 1993) is a South Korean footballer who plays as a forward for Suwon Samsung Bluewings.

Club career

Bayer Leverkusen
Although Ryu signed his first professional contract with Jeju United from the K League on 6 November 2013 as a free agent, only a month later, without playing a single professional game in K-League, the Korean club loaned him out to Bayer Leverkusen for the purpose of his professional development. Before moving to Bundesliga, Ryu showed his credentials on the international stage, scoring a couple of goals to help South Korea into the knockout round of the 2013 FIFA U-20 World Cup in Turkey. Ryu grabbed his first goal for Bayer Leverkusen in the second half of an hour-long friendly against Dutch side SC Heerenveen. Bayer Leverkusen's skipper Simon Rolfes praised Ryu for his "intelligent play, good movement and use of space." On 25 January 2014, Ryu made his first official Bundesliga debut against SC Freiburg, substituting his South Korean compatriot Son Heung-Min in the second half. Unfortunately, the game ended in a 3–2 defeat for Leverkusen.

Eintracht Braunschweig (loan)
On 15 August 2014, Ryu joined Eintracht Braunschweig on a half-season long loan to replace the injured Jan Hochscheidt. The loan spell was extended for another six months in December 2014.

Arminia Bielefeld (loan)
He was loaned to Arminia Bielefeld on 1 February 2016.

Ferencváros (loan)
He was loaned to Ferencvárosi TC on 1 August 2016.

Return to Jeju united
In July 2017 Ryu signed again with his boyhood club Jeju United.

International career
Ryu plays in the South Korea U20 football team. He was called up for South Korea's 21-man squad for the 2013 FIFA U-20 World Cup in Turkey, and scored the winning goal against Cuba in the side's opening match of the tournament. On 24 June 2013, Ryu netted an equalizer in South Korea's 2–2 draw against Portugal. On 27 June 2013, Ryu was injured and substituted during South Korea's final game of the group stage against Nigeria, forcing him to miss out their Round of 16 match against Colombia, and subsequently, their Quarter-final loss against Iraq.

References

External links

Ryu Seung-woo – National Team Stats at KFA 

Living people
1993 births
People from Gimhae
Association football forwards
South Korean footballers
South Korea under-20 international footballers
South Korea under-23 international footballers
South Korean expatriate footballers
Jeju United FC players
Bayer 04 Leverkusen players
Eintracht Braunschweig players
Arminia Bielefeld players
Ferencvárosi TC footballers
Gimcheon Sangmu FC players
Suwon Samsung Bluewings players
Bundesliga players
2. Bundesliga players
Nemzeti Bajnokság I players
K League 1 players
K League 2 players
Expatriate footballers in Germany
South Korean expatriate sportspeople in Germany
Expatriate footballers in Hungary
South Korean expatriate sportspeople in Hungary
Chung-Ang University alumni
Footballers at the 2016 Summer Olympics
Olympic footballers of South Korea